Beydoun is a surname. Notable people with the surname include:

 Abbas Beydoun (born 1945), Lebanese poet, novelist and journalist
 Nasser Beydoun, American business executive
 Ziad Rafiq Beydoun (1924–1998), Lebanese petroleum geologist